St Annes Monastic House is an Orthodox monastic house in North Yorkshire, England. The house is from modern times, being founded in 1995 and is located north east of York Minster.

References

Monasteries in North Yorkshire
Eastern Orthodox monasteries in the United Kingdom